Young Christian Democrats may refer to:

Youth organizations

 Young Christian Democrats (Sweden), the youth wing of the Christian Democrats
 Young Christian Democrats (Belarus), the youth wing of the Belarusian Christian Democracy
 Young Christian Democrats (Czech Republic), the youth wing of KDU-ČSL
 Young Christian Democrats (Lithuania)
 Young Christian Democrats (Norway), the youth wing of the Christian Democratic Party